Dale Jennings may refer to:
Dale Jennings (activist)
Dale Jennings (footballer)